The UK Singles Chart is one of many music charts compiled by the Official Charts Company that calculates the best-selling singles of the week in the United Kingdom. Since 2004, the chart has been based on the sales of both physical singles and digital downloads, with airplay figures excluded from the official chart. From 6 July 2014, streaming figures became incorporated into the singles chart which means that a song will count as a sale, if streamed 100 times. This list shows singles that peaked in the Top 10 of the UK Singles Chart during 2015, as well as singles which peaked in 2014 and 2016 but were in the top 10 in 2015. The entry date is when the song appeared in the top 10 for the first time (week ending, as published by the Official Charts Company, which is six days after the chart is announced).

One-hundred and fifteen singles were in the top ten in 2015. Eight singles from 2014 remained in the top 10 for several weeks at the beginning of the year, while "History" by One Direction was released in 2015 but did not reach its peak until 2016. Eighteen artists scored multiple entries in the top 10 in 2015. Charlie Puth, Fifth Harmony, Kygo, Lost Frequencies, The Weeknd and Zara Larsson were among the many artists who achieved their first UK charting top 10 single in 2015.

The Christmas number one - "A Bridge Over You" by the Lewisham and Greenwich NHS Choir - set the record for the biggest drop from number-one, falling to number 29 on its second week on the chart, and only the fourth number-one single in history to leave the top 10 after one week.

"Uptown Funk" by British record producer Mark Ronson and American singer-songwriter Bruno Mars  returned to number-one for the first six weeks of 2015, giving the song a total of seven weeks on top of the chart. The song had vacated the top spot for one week as the X Factor series 11 winner Ben Haenow secured the 2014 Christmas number one with "Something I Need". The first new number-one single of the year was "Love Me like You Do" by British singer Ellie Goulding, taken from the soundtrack of the film Fifty Shades of Grey. Overall, twenty-four different singles peaked at number-one in 2015, with Jess Glynne and Justin Bieber (3) having the joint most singles hit that position.

Background

Multiple entries 
One-hundred and fifteen singles charted in the top 10 in 2015, with one-hundred and four singles reaching their peak this year.

Eighteen artists scored multiple entries in the top 10 in 2009. Jess Glynne and Justin Bieber shared the record for most top 10 hits in 2015 with four hit singles each.

Sharpest fall from number-one 
“A Bridge Over You” by Lewisham and Greenwich NHS Choir - 2015's Christmas number-one - set an unwanted record as it suffered the steepest drop from the top spot in chart history. The week after topping the chart it fell to number 29, making way for Justin Bieber's "Love Yourself" to reclaim the number-one position. It remained a record until July 2018, when “Three Lions” by Baddiel, Skinner & The Lightning Seeds fell 96 places from the number-one position. It was also the first single to suffer this fate since "Baby's Coming Back"/"Transylvania" by McFly in 2007.

Chart debuts 
Sixty-seven artists achieved their first top 10 single in 2015, either as a lead or featured artist. Of these, five went on to record another hit single that year: Charlie Puth, Galantis, James Bay, Philip George and Sigala. The Weeknd had two other entries in his breakthrough year.

The following table (collapsed on desktop site) does not include acts who had previously charted as part of a group and secured their first top 10 solo single. 

Notes
Jack Ü is made up of Skrillex and Diplo. Skrillex had not recorded a top 10 single before but Diplo was featured on "Earthquake" by DJ Fresh. Alex Newell was an uncredited vocalist on Clean Bandit's "Stronger" (charted 2 May 2015). Nick Jonas relaunched his solo career in 2014 and had his first top 10 charting single, "Jealous", outside Jonas Brothers in 2015. The group had never reached the top 10; the closest they came was with "S.O.S" in 2008 which peaked at number 13.

Songs from films 
Original songs from various films entered the top 10 throughout the year. These included "Earned It" and "Love Me Like You Do" (from Fifty Shades of Grey), "See You Again" (Furious 7), "Elastic Heart" (The Hunger Games: Catching Fire), "Lost Stars" (Begin Again, covered by Stevie McCrorie) and "Writing's on the Wall" (Spectre).

Best-selling singles 
Mark Ronson & Bruno Mars had the best-selling single of the year with "Uptown Funk". The song spent 18 weeks in the top 10 (including seven weeks at number 1), sold around 1.76 million copies (including streams) and was certified 4× platinum by the BPI. "Cheerleader" by Omi came in second place, selling more than 1.52 million and losing out by around 240,000 sales. Hozier's "Take Me to Church", "Love Me Like You Do from Ellie Goulding and "See You Again" by Wiz Khalifa featuring Charlie Puth made up the top five. Singles by Adele, Major Lazer & DJ Snake featuring MØ, James Bay and Justin Bieber ("What Do You Mean?" and "Sorry") were also in the top 10 best-selling singles of 2015.

Top-ten singles 
Key

Entries by artist 

 
 

The following table shows artists who achieved two or more top 10 entries in 2015, including singles that reached their peak in 2014 or 2016. The figures include both main artists and featured artists, while appearances on ensemble charity records are also counted for each artist. The total number of weeks an artist spent in the top ten in 2015 is also shown.

See also 
 2015 in British music
 List of UK Singles Chart number ones of the 2010s

References

Notes 

 "Like I Can" re-entered the top 10 at number 10 on 24 January 2015 (week ending).
 "Wrapped Up" re-entered the top 10 at number 9 on 3 January 2015 (week ending).
 "Ayo" re-entered the top 10 at number 10 on 7 March 2015 (week ending).
 "Sugar" re-entered the top 10 at number 10 on 28 March 2015 (week ending).
 "Cheerleader" re-entered the top 10 at number 9 on 23 July 2015 (week ending).
 "Lean On" re-entered the top 10 at number 10 on 6 August 2015 (week ending).
 "Intoxicated" re-entered the top 10 at number 9 on 24 September 2015 (week ending).
 "Writing's On The Wall" re-entered the top 10 at number 4 on 5 November 2015 (week ending).
 "Perfect" re-entered the top 10 at number 10 on 26 November 2015 (week ending).
 "The Hills" re-entered the top 10 at number 10 on 10 December 2015 (week ending).
 "Never Forget You" re-entered the top 10 at number 10 on 7 January 2016 (week ending).
 "Sax" re-entered the top 10 at number 6 on 7 January 2016 (week ending).
 Figure includes one single as part of Major Lazer and one with Jack Ü.
 Adam Levine had one solo entry (featuring R. City) and one single as part of Maroon 5.
 Released as the official single for Comic Relief.
 Released as the official single for Children in Need.
 Figure includes appearance on Tinie Tempah's "Not Letting Go".
 Figure includes appearance on Pia Mia's "Do It Again".
 Figure includes appearance on Charlie Puth's "Marvin Gaye".
 Figure includes appearance on R. City's "Locked Away".
 Figure includes appearance on Wiz Khalifa's "See You Again".
 Figure includes appearance on Olly Murs' "Up".
 Figure includes appearances on Krept and Konan's "Freak of the Week" and Natalie La Rose's "Somebody".
 Figure includes appearance on Charli XCX's "Doing It".
 Figure includes appearance on KDA's "Turn the Music Louder (Rumble)".
 Figure includes appearance on Martin Garrix's "Don't Look Down".
 Figure includes song that peaked in 2014.
 Figure includes song that peaked in 2016.
 “You Don’t Own Me” was used by ‘’House of Fraser’’ in their Christmas television advertising campaign.

Citations

Sources

External links 
2015 singles chart archive at the Official Charts Company (click on relevant week)

United Kingdom top ten singles
Top ten singles
2015